Rudy Bowman (December 15, 1890 – October 29, 1972) was an American actor.

During World War I, Bowman's throat was injured by shrapnel, causing him to lose his voice. His recovery and subsequent work as an actor were featured on The Rudy Bowman Story, a program broadcast on CBS radio on August 17, 1949.

Bowman played mostly small and uncredited roles in various westerns, such as playing a juror in 1956's Gunsmoke episode “Custer” and in its 1961 episode "The Squaw”.  His film appearances include She Wore a Yellow Ribbon (1949). He also guest starred as Robert E. Lee in The Twilight Zone episode "The Bard".

References

External links

20th-century American male actors
1890 births
1972 deaths
American male film actors